Carabus scheidleri is a species of beetle. It is endemic to Europe, where it is found in Austria, the Czech Republic, Germany, Hungary, Liechtenstein, Poland, Slovakia,.

References

scheidleri
Beetles described in 1799
Beetles of Europe